Ansim Station is the terminal train station of Daegu Metro Line 1 at Dong-gu in Daegu, South Korea. The name of the station comes from King Taejo of Goryeo, who was victorious in battles with Later Baekje, and felt relieved when he went to the location "Ansim". The literal translation of "Ansim" is "relieved" and "peace of mind".

Ansim Depot
Cars and heavy overhaul for Line 1 cars are completed here. The depot is on Daerim-ro and visible from southside of Gyeongbu Expressway.

Station Layout

References

External links
 Cyber station information from Daegu Metropolitan Transit Corporation

Dong District, Daegu
Daegu Metro stations
Railway stations opened in 1998